Italy participated in the Junior Eurovision Song Contest 2017 which took place on 26 November 2016 in Tbilisi, Georgia. The Italian broadcaster Rai Gulp, which is a channel owned by Radiotelevisione Italiana (RAI), was responsible for organising their entry for the contest. Maria Iside Fiore was internally selected to represent Italy with the song "Scelgo (My Choice)".

Background

Before Junior Eurovision
The Italian broadcaster announced on 26 June 2017, that they would be participating at the contest which takes place on 26 November 2017, in Tbilisi, Georgia. The method for selecting their entrant and song was done internally by the national broadcaster, RAI. On 4 October 2017, it was announced that Maria Iside Fiore would be representing Italy at the contest with the song "Scelgo (My Choice)".

Artist and song information

Maria Iside Fiore
Maria Iside Fiore (born 10 October 2004) is an Italian singer. She represented Italy at the Junior Eurovision Song Contest 2017 in Tbilisi, Georgia, on 26 November 2017 with the song "Scelgo".

Scelgo
"Scelgo (My Choice)" is a song by Italian singer Maria Iside Fiore. It represented Italy during the Junior Eurovision Song Contest 2017.

At Junior Eurovision
During the opening ceremony and the running order draw which took place on 20 November 2017, Italy was drawn to perform sixteenth (last) on 26 November 2017, following Australia.

Voting

Detailed voting results

References

Italy
Junior
Junior Eurovision Song Contest